The Lot (formerly also written Loth) was a unit of measurement of mass, which was mainly used in German-speaking states of the Holy Roman Empire and in Scandinavia.

It was replaced in the German Reich in 1868/69/72, in Austria in 1871/76 and in Switzerland in 1875/77 by the metric unit of measurement, the gramme. But in the early 20th century it was still used as a popular unit of measure in cooking and baking recipes.

An imprecise but clear rule of thumb is that a lot corresponds to a "spoonful".

Old Lot 
In Germany, Austria and Switzerland, the following weight system was traditionally used:

 (trading) Pfund = 1 Lot = 4 Quents = 16 Pfennig weights  = 32 Heller weights

The Lot had different weights in the various German states depending on the definition of the Pfund ("pound"); its definition also varied over time. However it was mostly set at between 14 g and 18 g. Some examples:

 14.606 g before May 1856 in Prussia, Anhalt, Hesse, Homburg, Frankfurt am Main, Lippe-Detmold, Schaumburg-Lippe, Mecklenburg-Strelitz, Nassau, Reuss, Saxony, Saxe-Altenburg, Saxe-Coburg, Saxe-Gotha, Saxe-Weimar, Schwarzburg-Rudolstadt, Schwarzburg-Sondershausen, Waldeck and Württemberg
 15.1 g in Mecklenburg-Schwerin
 15.2 g in Lübeck
 15.6 g in Baden, Bremen and the Grand Duchy of Hesse
 15 = 15.625g in Württemberg
 15.9 g in Saxe-Meiningen
 17.5 g in Austria
 17.6 g in Bavaria

New Lot, Zoll-Lot, Postlot 
On 27 May 1856, an act concerning "a common state weight" system was issued in Prussia for the German Customs Union (Deutscher Zollverein). This redefined the weights as follow:

 1 Pfund = 0.5 kg
  Last =  Center =  Pfund = 1 Lot = 10 Quents = 100 Cents = 1,000 Grains

1 Lot corresponded to 16.666 g and at the same time to a Vereinstaler fine. It was thus also used as a unit of silver fineness within the monetary system. See Lot (fineness).

In comparison tables of old and new units of measurement of the same name in Prussia, the pre-1856 Lot (and also other units of measurement) was often used with the prefix "old" and the new Lot, valid from 27 May 1856, with the prefix "Neu" ("new") or "Zoll" ("customs"). The post office also used the term Postlot from 1858.

Apart from Prussia, this classification of weights also applied in Anhalt, Mecklenburg-Schwerin, Mecklenburg-Strelitz, Saxony and the Thuringian states.

In north-western Germany, on the other hand, the unit system was adapted more closely to the metric system at the same time. In Brunswick, Bremen, Hamburg, Hanover, Lübeck, Oldenburg and Schaumburg-Lippe the lot was defined as a tenth of a Zollpfund = 50g. In the other states, the pound remained divided into 32 lots.

In Austria and Bavaria there was for a time a "metric Lot" of 10 g (repealed by law in 1888). In Austria, the Czech Republic and Poland, this metric Lot lives on as the  decagramme to this day.

See also
 Old Polish units of measurement
 Obsolete Finnish units of measurement
 Obsolete Russian units of measurement
 Obsolete Tatar units of measurement

References

External links
 :sk:Libra (hmotnosť) an extensive (20+) list of values (in grams) a pound had at various times and places in Europe
 :bg:Фунт (единица) a historical value of lot in Bulgaria

Obsolete units of measurement
Units of mass